The unified strength theory (UST). proposed by Yu Mao-Hong is a series of yield criteria (see yield surface) and failure criteria (see Material failure theory). It is a generalized classical strength theory which can be used to describe the yielding or failure of material begins when the combination of principal stresses reaches a critical value.

Mathematical Formulation 
Mathematically, the formulation of UST is expressed in principal stress state as 

The unified yield criterion (UYC) is the simplification of UST when , i.e.

Limit surfaces of Unified Strength Theory 
The limit surfaces of the unified strength theory in principal stress space are usually a semi-infinite dodecahedron cone with unequal sides. The limit surfaces of UST and UYC are shown as follows.

Derivation of Unified Strength Theory 
Twin-shear element models proposed by Mao-Hong Yu are used for representing the twin-shear stress state. Considering all the stress components of the twin-shear models and their different effects yields the unified strength theory as

The relations among the stresses components and principal stresses read

The  and C should be obtained by uniaxial failure state

History of Unified Strength Theory 
The development of the unified strength theory can be divided into three stages as follows.
1.

2. Twin-shear strength theory (UST with ).

3. Unified strength theory.

Applications of the Unified Strength theory 
Unified strength theory has been used in Generalized Plasticity, Structural Plasticity, Computational Plasticity and many other fields

References 

Mechanical failure